A clarinet–cello–piano trio is a clarinet trio made up of one clarinet, one cello, and one piano, or the name of a piece written for such a group.

This formation is similar to the classical piano trio except that the violin is replaced by the clarinet. The heterogeneity of timbre between clarinet and cello prevents their use  as a block against the piano, but it offers many other musical possibilities.

Long-lived trios (such as the Trio Montecino) are very rare, but the literature is performed by subsets of Pierrot lunaire and Quartet for the End of Time ensembles, such as Tashi, as well as by ad hoc groups.

Repertoire 

The original repertoire for clarinet, cello and piano (by name of composer with date & publisher where known) includes:

Mark Abel (b. 1948)
 Trio (2017)
 James Aikman (b. 1959)  Trio for Clarinet in B-Flat, 'Cello and Piano
Johan F. Amberg (1846–1928)
Trio Op. 11 in E flat
Fantasiestucke Op. 12 (originally for viola clarinet piano)
 Simul: Lumini, Sombri (2004) For Clarinet in La, Violoncello and Piano 
Georges Aperghis (1945)
Trio (1996)
Edward Applebaum (b. 1937)
Montages (1969 Wilhelm Hansen/J&W Chester)
Sérgio Azevedo (b. 1968)
 Berliner Trio (2004, AVA-Musical Editions)
 Trio — in memoriam Constança Capdeville (2012, AVA-Musical Editions)
James Scott Balentine
The Graham Trio (1978)
Robert Baksa
Piano Trio No. 1, Op. 25 (1971)
Greg Bartholomew
Suite from Razumov (2003)
Conrad Beck
Alternances
Ludwig van Beethoven
Trio No. 4, Op. 11 in B flat
Trio Op. 38 (arrangement by the composer of the Septet Op. 20)
Wilhelm Berger
Trio Op. 94 in G (1905, Kahnt)
Günter Bialas
Moment musicaus III (1975–6)
Valentin Bibik
Trio Op. 127 (1998)
John G. Bilotta
Petroushka Dreams (2006) 
Adolphe Blanc
Trio Op. 23 in Bb major (1857)
Karl-Birger Blomdahl
Trio (1955)
 Theodor Blumer
Suite (trio) Op. 97 (Zimmerman, n.d.)
Johannes Brahms
 Trio Op. 114 in A minor (optionally for viola)
 Braunlich 
Trio
Frederic Brooks
Trio, Op. 12 in E flat (C. Woolhouse 1906)
Max Bruch
 8 Pieces Op. 83 for clarinet and viola, arranged for piano trio by the composer and often performed with clarinet and cello       
Ann Callaway
The Memory Palace (2007 Laureate Press, distr. BMM)
Friedrich Cerha 	
Fünf Stücke (1999/2000)
Osvaldo Coluccino
Without witness (2004, RAI Trade ed.)
Gaetano Corticelli
3 Trios, Op. 56, Op. 60, Op. 63
Robert Delanoff (b. 1942)
Trio
Milica Djordjevic
pod vodom raskršća snova (2019)
Armağan Durdağ (b. 1981)
Taylan (2015)
Pascal Dusapin
Trio Rombach, for piano, violin or clarinet and cello (1997)
Horst Ebenhöh
Trio Op. 87 No. 1 (1996)
Anton Eberl
Grand trio, Op. 36 (1806)
Louise Farrenc
Trio Op. 44 in E flat (optionally for vln.)
Benoit Constant Fauconier
Fantasie concertante, for flute or clarinet, violin and piano (publ. about 1820, Schott)
Benjamin Frankel
Trio, Op. 10 (1940)
Pezzi pianissimi, Op. 41 (1964)
Carl Frühling
Trio in A minor, Op. 40
Beat Furrer (b. 1954)
Aer (1991)
Daniel S. Godfrey
Impromptu (1984) (7', G. Schirmer)
Frederic Goossen (1927–2011)
Trio (1979, American Composers Alliance)
Henryk Górecki (1933–2010)
Lerchenmusik, Op. 53 (1984)
Harold Gramatges (b. 1918)
Trio (1944)
Christoph Graupner	
in F major Clarinet / Cello / Cembalo	(there is a trio, Gwv 201, for bassoon, chalumeau & continuo in C major) 	 	
C.H. Grovermann
Trio in B
Emil Hartmann
Serenade Op. 24 in A
Alfred Hill
Miniature Trio No.1 in F
Gilad Hochman (b. 1982)
Shedun Fini — hommage to F. Schubert's Symphony in B minor
Vagn Holmboe
Trio Op. 137 (1978)
 Eco  Op. 186 (1991) (both W. Hansen)
Toshio Hosokawa	
Vertical Time, Study I (1992)
Klaus Huber
Schattenblätter (1975) — uses Bass clarinet
Franz Hunten
Terzetto, Op.175
Vincent d'Indy
 Trio Op. 29 in B flat
John Ireland
 Clarinet Trio in D Major
Nikos Ioakeim (b. 1978)
When a B wants to Boogie-woogie But another B gets the Blues (2010; 8 minutes)
David Johnstone
Trio Sinfonico (pub. 2007, Creighton's Collection)
Paul Juon
Four Trio Miniatures (1901) version of piano Trio in A minor Op. 17 Op. 18, No.3, 6, & 7 originally for piano solo and Op. 24, No.2 for piano four hands.
John Kaefer
Chamber Sonata No. 1: Shadow Voices [1994; 13 minutes]
Robert Kahn
Trio, Op. 45 in G (1906)
Trio Serenade Op. 73 (orig. Horn-oboe-piano; version D for Clarinet–cello–piano)
Harrison Kerr
Trio (1936)
Jan Koetsier
Trio, Op. 13 No.2 (1937, rev. 1981 Donemus)
Kubizek
Trio Op.26a
Helmut Lachenmann 	
Allegro Sostenuto (1986–8) — clarinet doubling bass clarinet.
Heinrich Eduard Josef von Lannoy (1787–1853)
Trio in B flat major, Op. 15
J. X. (Borrel) Lefevre
Sonatas No. 2 and No. 3
Kenneth Leighton
Fantasy on an American Hymn Tune, Op. 70 (Novello, 1974)
Gerald Levinson (b. 1951)
Trio (Theodor Presser)
Jacques Lenot
 Lied 3
Domenico Liverani
 Terzettino dal Trovatore de Verdi
Charles Harford Lloyd (1849–1919)
Trio in B flat
Theo Loevendie
Lerchen Trio (1992, in memoriam Olivier Messiaen)
Ruggero Lolini
Trio Concertante (Bruzzichelli, Florence, 1979)
Bent Lorentzen
Mambo (1982, Edition Wilhelm Hansen)
François-Bernard Mâche
Brûlis (1999; 16 minutes)
Giuseppe Manghenoni (around 1800) / Johann Simon Mayer (1765–1848)
Trio per pianoforte con clarinetto (B) e Violone (Cello) [2 movements] (Musica-Aeterna Verlag, 2014)
Philippe Manoury
Ultima (1996; 12 minutes)
Steven Harry Markowitz (b. 1963)
 Canonette for Piano, Clarinet, and Cello
Krzysztof Meyer
 Trio Op. 90 (1998)
Stefan Meylaers (b. 1970)
Trio (2000, Lantro Music)
I. Montuno
Three Fantasies
Robert Muczynski (1929–2010)
Op. 26 — Fantasy Trio, for Clarinet, Cello and Piano (1969, Theodore Presser Co.)
Per Nørgård
Spell (1973)
Trio, Op. 15 (1955)
Lior Navok
 Like a Whirling Sand-Clock
Frank Nuyts (b. 1957)
Bajadillas (2005; 11 minutes)
Robert Parris 
Trio
Pierre Poulteau
Sonatine 
Günther Raphael
Trio, Op. 70 (1950)
Ferdinand Ries
 Trio Op. 28 in G (1810)
Wolfgang Rihm	
Chiffre IV (1983) — Bass clarinet
Nino Rota
 Trio (1973, Schott)
 John Psathas
 Island Songs, clarinet trio (1995)
Archduke Rudolph
Trio
Helmut Schmidinger (b. 1969)
Gesang zwischen den Stühlen (2001, Doblinger)
verse sind wohl für die Musick das unentbehrlichste (2013, Litmus)
Hermann Schroeder
3rd Piano Trio Op. 43
Cyrill Schürch
Piano Trio No. 2
Cyril Scott
Trio (c. 1955, Peters Ed. London)
Roberto Sierra
Tres fantasías
Robert Simpson
Trio
Fantisek Jan Skroup
Trio, Op. 2 in E flat
 Juan Maria Solare (b. 1966)
 Milongas grecolatinas (2002)
 Pensierosa (milonga para tres) (2003)
 Sale con fritas (2005)
 Ochenta diciembres (2008)
Robert Starer
Trio
Eric Stokes (b. 1930)
Trio No.1 (1955, rev. 1963)
Martin Suckling
Visiones (after Goya) (2015)
Jay Sydeman
Trio Montagnana
Szunyogh
Trio Serenade
Marko Tajčević
7 Balkan Dances
Turok
Trio
Victor Urbancic (1903–1958)
Trio in A-Dur nach Art einer Serenade (1921, Iceland Music Information Center) 
Karl Vollweiler
Fantasie on Russian Airs, Op. 35 in D minor
Trio on Italian Themes, Op. 15
Julian Wagstaff (b. 1970)
A Persistent Illusion (2011, julianwagstaff.com)
Hebridean Sunset Rag (arrangement for piano trio, 2015, julianwagstaff.com)
Gwyneth Walker
Craftsbury Trio
Salem Reel
Robert Ward (1917–2013)
Echoes of America (1997, E. C. Schirmer)
Graham Waterhouse
 Gestural Variations
 Concentricities (2019)
Vally Weigl (1894–1982)
New England Suite (1953, American Composers Alliance)
Harri Wessman (1949)
Trio for clarinet, cello and piano (1994, Fennica Gehrman, Helsinki)
 Jörg Widmann
 Nachtstück 
John Woolrich
A Dramolet (2008, Faber Music)
Alexander Zemlinsky
 Trio Op. 3 in D minor
Hermann Zilcher  (see German article)
Trio in Form von Variationen a-moll Op. 90 für Klarinette, Violoncello und Klavier (1938)
Ramadan Zyberdi
Weaver Lass of Luma (Albanian Folk Song)

Substitution

In addition to this original repertoire, one can pick some pieces for clarinet-viola-piano trio or clarinet-violin-piano trio and replace the viola (violin) by the cello, or replace the violin by the clarinet in a classical Piano trio; cases where the composer has foreseen this possibility are listed above.  Other substitutions are possible:

Franciszek Lessel 
 Grand Trio, Op. 4 (Clarinet, Horn, Piano)
Mikhail Glinka
 Trio Pathetique for clarinet, bassoon and piano (1832, reprinted by Musica Rara as well as International Ed.)
Giovanni Bottesini
 Gran Duo Concertante (version for clarinet, string bass and Piano)
Isang Yun
Rencontre (1986) for clarinet–cello–harp

Transcription

The available repertoire has been expanded by transcribers (other than the composers, whose own transcriptions are listed under original repertoire above) as well:

Johannes Brahms (Rosenbloom)
Three Pieces (Op. 76 #5, Op. 76 #4; Op. 116, #7) 
Anton Dvorak (Büsing) 
Vier Legenden aus op.59 <Klar,Bassetthorn (or Vc), Pno>
Engelbert Humperdinck (Sandre) 
Hänsel und Gretel (Auswahl) in einer Bearbeitung von Gustave Sandre (ca 1909)
Felix Mendelssohn-B., Felix (Päuler) 
3 Stücke op.35 No.4, op.53 No.2, op.38 No.6
Robert Schumann (Büsing) 
Bilder aus dem Osten op.66, 6 Impromptus <Klar,Bassetthr(Vc),Pno>.

See also 
 Clarinet-violin-piano trio
 Clarinet-viola-piano trio
 Piano trio
 Piano trio repertoire

External links
 Like a Whirling Sand-Clock sound recording
 discussion at cellofun.com
 An extensive list of works for sale
 first and second CDs by Trio Montecino
 Torun Trio

Chamber music
 
 
 
 
Types of musical groups